Colombia competed at the 2018 Winter Olympics in Pyeongchang, South Korea, from 9 to 25 February 2018. The country returned to the Winter Olympics after last competing in 2010, which also marked its debut. The Colombian team consisted of three males and one female, competing in three different sports.

Competitors
The following is the list of number of competitors participating in the Colombian delegation per sport.

Alpine skiing 

Colombia qualified one male athlete, Michael Poettoz. Poettoz was born in Cali and was adopted by a French family when he was aged 21 months. Poettoz grew up and learned how to ski in Les Carroz d'Araches, France. Poettoz also represented the country at the Winter Youth Olympics in 2016 in Lillehammer, Norway. Poettoz's upbringing is similar to Madagascar's Mialitiana Clerc, who also qualified to compete at the 2018 Games.

Cross-country skiing 

Colombia qualified one male athlete, Sebastián Uprimny. Uprimny was born to Colombian parents in Paris, France. Colombia made its Winter Olympics debut in the sport.

Distance

Speed skating 

Colombia is one of the strongest nations in inline speed skating, as it was the overall champion since 2010 at the World Roller Speed Skating Championships. However the sport is not on the Olympic program. In 2015, the Colombian Federation of Inline Skating was approved by the International Skating Union to become a member in the (ice) speed skating branch, allowing the nation the possibility to qualify for the Winter Olympics. One Colombian male skater won a provisional quota spot in the men's 500 m and 1000 m event. Causil was the first speed skater from South America to compete at the Winter Olympics, also marking Colombia's debut in the sport. Colombia was later reallocated a spot for a female speed skater in the women's mass start. This was because of the reallocation of quotas from Russian athletes.

Individual

Mass start

See also
Colombia at the 2016 Winter Youth Olympics

References

Nations at the 2018 Winter Olympics
2018
2018 in Colombian sport